This is a list of songs about London by notable artists. Instrumental pieces are tagged with an uppercase "[I]", or a lowercase "[i]" for quasi-instrumental including non-lyrics voice samples.

Included are:

 Songs titled after London, or a location or feature of the city.
 Songs whose lyrics are set in London.

Excluded are:

 Songs where London (or parts of London) are simply name-checked (e.g. "New York, London, Paris, Munich", lyrics of "Pop Muzik" by M).

0–9

A

B

C

D

E

F

G

H

I

J

K

L

M

N

O

P

Q

 "Queen Mary's Garden" by Haydn Wood
 "Queensbury Station" by The Magoo Brothers
 "Queue At Drury Lane" from Kean (musical)

R

S

T

U

V

W

X

 "XR2" by MIA

Y

See also
 List of music videos set in London

References

External links
 Readers recommend: songs about London, The Guardian, 7 July 2006
 Songs about Regent's Park and Primrose Hill
 Songs about London and Europe
 The London Nobody Sings

London
Culture in London
London-related lists
Songs about London
British music-related lists